The Cymru South is a regional football league in Wales, covering the southern half of the country. It has clubs with semi-professional status and together with the Cymru North, it forms the second tier of the Welsh football league system.

The first year of its operation was in 2019–20 with the Football Association of Wales owning and administering the tier 2 leagues for the first time.  These changes followed on from a review of the Welsh Football Pyramid. Prior to 2019, the equivalent league was the Welsh Football League Division One, covering South Wales.

Member clubs for 2022–23 season
The following teams were confirmed as members for the season after the Football Association of Wales confirmed relegation from, and promotion to the league in June 2020.

Champions

 2019–20: Swansea University
 2020–21: Competition cancelled due to COVID-19 restrictions
 2021–22: Llantwit Major

Promoted to Cymru Premier

 2019–20: Havefordwest County (runners-up)
 2020-21: Competition cancelled
 2021–22: Pontypridd Town A.F.C. (runners-up)

Relegated into Cymru South from Cymru Premier

 2019–20: Carmarthen Town
 2020–21: Competition cancelled
 2021-22: Barry Town United

Relegated from Cymru South

 2019–20: STM Sports, Cwmamman United and Caerau (Ely)
 2020–21: Competition cancelled
 2021–22:  Port Talbot Town,  Risca United and  Undy Athletic

Promoted into Cymru South

 2019–20: Trefelin, Risca United and Port Talbot Town
 2020–21: Competition cancelled
 2021–22: Abergavenny Town, Pontardawe Town and Ynyshir Albions

See also
List of association football competitions
Welsh Football League
Cymru Championship

References

External links
Official site of the JD Cymru South
SOCCERWAY (FAW Championship summary)

 
2
Sports leagues established in 2019
2019 establishments in Wales
Wales
Semi-professional sports leagues